Succinprotocetraric acid is an organic chemical compound with the formula C22H18O12. It is the ester of succinic acid and protocetraric acid and it is classified as a depsidone.

Succinprotocetraric acid is produced by certain lichens.

Known sources 

 Buellia capensis
 Chondropsis semiviridis
 Menegazzia petraea
 Parmelia reptans

References 

Carbonyl compounds
Heterocyclic compounds with 3 rings
Dicarboxylic acids
Carboxylate esters
Lactones